Khushiram Jeswani (born 13 September 1940) is an Indian politician. He was elected to the Lok Sabha, lower house of the Parliament of India from Kheda , Gujarat as a member of the Bharatiya Janata Party.

References

External links
Official biographical sketch in Parliament of India website

India MPs 1991–1996
Lok Sabha members from Gujarat
Bharatiya Janata Party politicians from Gujarat
1940 births
Living people